The IIFA Best Cinematography  is a technical award chosen ahead of the ceremonies.

See also 
 IIFA Awards
 Bollywood
 Cinema of India

References

External links
 2008 winners 

International Indian Film Academy Awards
Awards for best cinematography